Sebastián Miguel (7 February 1931 – 15 July 2006) was a Spanish professional golfer.

Miguel was born in Madrid. He won several major tournaments around Europe during the 1950s and 60s, including the Spanish Open in 1954, 1960 and 1967 and the Portuguese Open in 1959. He also won the Spanish Professionals Championship four times.

Miguel represented his country in the World Cup on eleven occasions. He finished in runners-up spot in the team event twice, in 1958 partnered by his brother Ángel, who also had a successful professional career, and again in 1963 partnered by Ramón Sota.

Miguel performed well in The Open Championship, finishing in the top ten four times, with a best of tied for 6th place in 1967. In the 1961 Open he tied for 14th alongside his brother. He also played in the U.S. Masters three times, but never made the cut.

Professional wins
1954 Spanish Open
1955 Monte Carlo Open
1958 Spanish Professionals Championship
1959 Portuguese Open
1960 Spanish Open
1963 Open de Castilla
1966 Spanish Professionals Championship
1967 Spanish Open, Spanish Professionals Championship
1968 Spanish Professionals Championship

Results in major championships

Note: Miguel only played in the Masters Tournament and The Open Championship.

CUT = missed the half-way cut
"T" indicates a tie for a place

Team appearances
World Cup (representing Spain): 1954, 1955, 1956, 1958, 1959, 1960, 1961, 1963, 1966, 1967, 1968
Joy Cup (representing the Rest of Europe): 1954, 1956, 1958

References

Spanish male golfers
European Tour golfers
Golfers from Madrid
1931 births
2006 deaths
20th-century Spanish people
21st-century Spanish people